Sierra Carrascosa is a mountain range in the Maestrazgo comarca of Aragon, Teruel Province, Spain. The highest point in the range is Muela Carrascosa (1,214 m). The Guadalope River flows along the NW side of the range.

Geography
This 14 km long rocky range is located at the eastern end of the Iberian System and, like neighboring Sierra de Garrucha is characterized by very tight folds.
Close to its northeastern end there is a very striking red rock formation known as El Guerrero Romano, "The Roman Soldier". It is a spectacular sight, very visible from A-226 road between Bordón and Castellote. 

Villarluengo and Bordón are the most important towns in the vicinity of this range. 
The range is named after the Quercus coccifera spiny oak.

See also
Maestrazgo, Aragon

References

External links

Bordón
 Villarluengo - Teruel - Turismo
Sierra de Gúdar - Maestrazgo, Geografía física y humana
Parque Cultural del Maestrazgo

Carrascosa
Carrascosa